Joseph Alexander Gillies (September 17, 1849 – July 7, 1921) was a Canadian politician.

Born in Irish Cove, Nova Scotia, the son of John Gillies and Mary McLean, Gillies was educated at St. Francis Xavier University graduating in April 1871. He was called to the Nova Scotia bar in 1875 and practised law in Sydney. He was the registrar of probate for the County of Cape Breton, Nova Scotia from August 1872 until he resigned when he ran unsuccessfully for the riding of Cape Breton in the 1887 federal election. He was clerk of the Peace for Cape Breton county from December 1875 until January 1880 when the county was incorporated, and then he was appointed Municipal clerk, which he held until January 1883 when he became solicitor of the municipality (Sydney).

In 1883, he married Josephine Eulalie Bertrand. Gillies was named Queen's Counsel in 1895. In 1901, he purchased the Sydney Post.

He was elected to the House of Commons of Canada for the riding of Richmond in the 1891 election but unseated upon petition and at the by-election held in January 1892 was re-elected. A Conservative, he was re-elected in 1896. He was defeated in 1900 and again in 1904 and 1911.

Gillies died in Sydney at the age of 71.

Electoral record

References

This article incorporates text from The Canadian album: men of Canada, Vol. 3, a publication now in the public domain.

1849 births
1921 deaths
Conservative Party of Canada (1867–1942) MPs
Members of the House of Commons of Canada from Nova Scotia
St. Francis Xavier University alumni
Canadian King's Counsel